Gaius Norbanus, nicknamed Balbus (died 82 BC) was a Roman politician who was elected consul in 83 BC alongside Lucius Cornelius Scipio Asiaticus. He committed suicide in exile at Rhodes after being proscribed by Lucius Cornelius Sulla shortly after the latter's victory in the civil war.

Life

A novus homo, Gaius Norbanus first came to prominence when he was elected one of the plebeian tribunes for 103 BC. He achieved notoriety for his prosecution of Quintus Servilius Caepio, where he accused Servilius Caepio of incompetence and dereliction of duty at the catastrophic defeat of the Roman armies by the Cimbri at the Battle of Arausio in 105 BC. At the concilium plebis where Servilius Caepio was tried, two tribunes attempted to veto proceedings, but were driven off by force. Although the Senate vigorously tried to obtain his acquittal and he was defended by Lucius Licinius Crassus, Norbanus managed to secure Caepio's conviction. Caepio was forced into exile to Smyrna, while his fortune was confiscated.

In 101 BC, Norbanus served as quaestor under Marcus Antonius, grandfather of the triumvir Mark Antony, in his campaign against the pirates in Cilicia. In 94 BC, Norbanus was accused of minuta maiestas (treason) under the Lex Appuleia by Publius Sulpicius Rufus on account of the disturbances that had taken place at the trial of Caepio, but the eloquence of Marcus Antonius secured his acquittal.

This was followed by his election as Praetor in 89 BC, and his appointment as governor of Sicily. He kept the peace in his province, defending it against the Italian socii during the Social War. He managed to capture Rhegium from the Samnites in 88 BC.

During the civil war between Gaius Marius and Lucius Cornelius Sulla he sided with Marius. He was elected consul for 83 BC; at Mount Tifata, near Capua, he intercepted Sulla, who had returned to Italy from Greece. Sulla sent over some emissaries to discuss coming to terms with Norbanus, but they were thrown out when it became apparent that they were trying to suborn Norbanus’ men, who were mostly raw recruits. Although Norbanus was helped by Quintus Sertorius, they were defeated by Sulla at the Battle of Mount Tifata, losing around 6,000 men in the process. He managed to regroup his shattered army at Capua, whereupon he eventually retreated to Cisalpine Gaul. He and Gnaeus Papirius Carbo were defeated by Quintus Caecilius Metellus Pius at Faventia. Norbanus was betrayed by one of his legates, Publius Albinovanus, who murdered many of Norbanus’ principal officers after inviting them to dinner before surrendering Ariminium to Metellus Pius.

Norbanus himself did not attend Albinovanus' invitation, and he managed to evade capture, fleeing to Rhodes. After proscription by Sulla, he committed suicide in the middle of a market-place, while the leading citizens of Rhodes were debating whether to hand him over to Sulla's men.

Notes

Sources
 Broughton, T. Robert S., The Magistrates of the Roman Republic, Vols. I & II (1951)
 Broughton, T. Robert S., The Magistrates of the Roman Republic, Vol. III (1986)
 
 
 A. H. J. Greenidge, History of Rome.
 Theodor Mommsen, History of Rome, bk. iv. ch. v.;
 Smith, William, Dictionary of Greek and Roman Biography and Mythology, Vol I (1867).

References

2nd-century BC births
Year of birth uncertain
82 BC deaths
2nd-century BC Romans
1st-century BC Roman consuls
Ancient Roman generals
Ancient Roman politicians who committed suicide
Gaius
Tribunes of the plebs
Roman quaestors
Roman Republican praetors
Populares